John Ward (born August 2, 1950) is a Minnesota politician and former member of the Minnesota House of Representatives. A member of the Minnesota Democratic–Farmer–Labor Party, he represented District 10A, which included portions of Crow Wing County in the north central part of the state. He is also a retired teacher and coach.

Early life, education, and career
Ward graduated from Proctor High School in Proctor, then went on to the University of Minnesota in Duluth, receiving his B.S. in Physical Education and Health, and also certification in coaching and driver's education, in 1973. He later returned to U.M.D., earning his M.A. in Learning Disabilities in 1982. He graduated from the University of Wisconsin in Superior in 1984, earning his E.B.D. teaching certificate in Emotional Behavior Disorders.

Ward worked as an adult basic education instructor at Northeast Regional Corrections Center from 1974–1979, as director of alternative education for Independent School District 704 in Proctor from 1979–1987, and as an emotional behavior disorder instructor for the Brainerd School System from 1987–2006. He has also been a property and casualty insurance agent for EPIC Insurance since 1995. He was a member of the Proctor City Council from 1982–1984, and served as Proctor's mayor from 1984–1987.

Minnesota House of Representatives

Elections
Ward was first elected in 2006, and was re-elected in 2008, 2010, 2012.  Ward lost re-election in 2014 to Josh Heintzeman.

References

External links 

 Project Votesmart – Rep. John Ward Profile

1950 births
Living people
People from Crow Wing County, Minnesota
People from Brainerd, Minnesota
People from Proctor, Minnesota
Politicians from Duluth, Minnesota
Democratic Party members of the Minnesota House of Representatives
21st-century American politicians